Pirappu ( Birth) is a 2007 Tamil language romantic drama film directed by L. V. Ilangovan. The film stars newcomer Prabha, Karthika and newcomer Priya Mohan, with Mahadevan, Saranya Ponvannan, Vijay Krishnaraj, Sulakshana, Shanmugarajan, Anjali Devi, Ganja Karuppu and George Maryan playing supporting roles. It was released on 1 June 2007.

Plot

Marudhu (Mahadevan) and Kaliammal (Saranya Ponvannan) are a rich but childless couple. They adopt Kannan (Prabha), a young man from a lower caste. However, Kannan feels depressed to leave his parents and little sister for his new family. Kannan, Marudhu and Kaliammal then leave their place for Kaliammal's native village.

In Kaliammal's village, some villagers start to talk ill about Kannan's caste. Kaliammal's brother Shankarapandi (Shanmugarajan), a politician and caste fanatic, hates Kannan and fears that Kannan would receive his sister's inheritance. In the meantime, Shankarapandi's daughter Padma (Karthika Adaikalam) falls in love with Kannan, whereas Kannan and Meera (Priya Mohan) fall in love with each other. Thinking that his daughter and Kannan were in love with each other, Shankarapandi now wants Kannan to be his son-in-law. When Shankarapandi visits their home for the engagement, Kannan refuses to marry her; thus Shankarapandi felt humiliated. Padma's suicide attempt makes the situation worse.

Shankarapandi has a bad name among his caste people. To win the local election, he needs their support, and only Marudhu can help him. However, Marudhu refuses to help him and hates his view about the caste system. Meanwhile, Kannan is sick of this situation and leaves his home without informing his adoptive parents. A few days later, Marudhu and Kaliammal go to Meera's home to bring Kannan home, but he was not there. That night, Marudhu and Kaliammal are killed in a car explosion. Meera witnesses it, but she is hit by a car.

When Kannan returns home to perform the last rites for his adoptive parents, Shankarapandi humiliates him and is hell bent on performing the rites, thus receiving his sister's inheritance. Meera, who was in the hospital, tells Padma about the whole incident and blames Shankarapandi for the murders. Padma then orders Kannan to punish her father. An angry Kannan beats Shankarapandi up and tells him that money and caste do not matter to him. Meera takes a burning stick and gives it to Padma (Meera symbolically sacrifices her love). Padma then cremates the dead bodies. The film ends with Kannan leaving the place in tears and Padma following him.

Cast

Production

L.V. Ilangovan, who worked as an assistant to the director Bala, made his directorial debut with Pirappu. New face Prabha, who is from N. Lingusamy's family, was chosen to play the hero while Poornima Indrajith's sister Priya Mohan (credited as Mayuka) and Karthika Adaikalam were selected to play to play the female lead roles. Actress Nanditha Jennifer signed to perform for a Koothu song shot near Pollachi. Balu Mahendra's son Shanky Mahendran was chosen to handle the camera.

Soundtrack

The music was composed by Bharadwaj, with lyrics written by Mu. Metha, Kamakodiyan, Pazhani Bharathi and Pa. Vijay. The audio was released on 18 January 2007 in Chennai. K. Bhagyaraj, K. R. Gangadharan, Ameer and N. Lingusamy attended the audio function. The song "Ulaga Azhagi Naan Thaan" became a chartbuster.

Release

Initially, the film had its release date fixed on 14 April 2007 (coinciding with Tamil New Year), but it was released on 1 June 2007. A reviewer wrote, "Nothing new shown in the movie except new faces, the song scored by Bhardwaj sounds Ok. Debutant director able to cover the film with allotted money and time, new faces had cleared the screen without much difficulty" and called it "below average".

References

2007 films
2000s Tamil-language films
2007 romantic drama films
Indian romantic drama films
Films scored by Bharadwaj (composer)
2007 directorial debut films